Miss World America 2019 was the 11th edition of the Miss World America pageant and was held on October 12, 2019. 42 contestants from all over the country competed for the crown. Marisa Butler of Maine crowned her successor Emmy Rose Cuvelier of South Dakota at the end of the event, Cuvelier represented the United States at Miss World 2019 in London and placed in the Top 40.

Results

Placements

Challenge Events

People's Choice

Beauty With a Purpose

Top Influencers Award

Entrepreneur Challenge

Talent

Top Model

Sports/Fitness Challenge

Best in Interview

Judges
Final Judges:
Vanessa Ponce de León - Miss World 2018 from Mexico
Victoria Mendoza - Miss World America 2015 from Arizona
Alexia Rae Castillo - Queen Beauty USA 2019
La Toya Jackson
Jacob Arabo
Richard Morrissey
Maureen Francisco
Pol' Atteu
Patrik Simpson

Contestants

42 delegates were confirmed.

Other pageant notes

Returns
Last competed in 2014:

Last competed in 2015:

Last competed in 2016:

Last competed in 2017:

Withdrawal
  - Kathy Zhu was named as Miss Michigan World 2019, but organizers dethroned her for content deemed “offensive” on her social media accounts, which raised immense controversy.

Did not compete
 
  - Kathy Zhu (see Michigan under withdrawals)

Crossovers

Contestants who previously competed at or will be competing at other beauty pageants:

Miss USA
2017: : Megan Gordon (Top 5)
2017: : Lauren Roush (as )
2019: : Alexandra Plotz
2022: : Elisabeth Bradley (as ) 
2023:
: Manju Bangalore (as ) 

Miss Teen USA
2012: : Alexandra Plotz (Top 16)
2020: : Peyton Brown (Top 16)

Miss World America
2017: : Marjana Chowdhury (Top 16; as )
2018: : Manju Bangalore (Top 10; as )

Miss Asia Pacific International
2018: : Marjana Chowdhury (Top 20; as )

References

External links
Miss World Official Website
Miss World America Official Website

2019 in the United States
Miss World America
2019
2019 in Nevada